This is the current Swedish name day calendar, adopted in 2001 by a work group led by the Swedish Academy. The new list has no official status, but is nevertheless used by most publishers. Several name day lists existed after 1972, when the old name day calendar lost its official status. The new list will be updated every 15 years. Some of the names below are linked to the original saints or martyrs from which they originate.

January
Nyårsdagen (New Year's Day, no name)
Svea
Alfred, Alfrida
Rut
Hanna, Hannele
Kasper, Melker, Baltsar
August, Augusta
Erland
Gunnar, Gunder
Sigurd, Sigbritt
Jan, Jannike
Frideborg, Fridolf
Knut
Felix, Felicia
Laura, Lorentz
Hjalmar, Helmer
Anton, Tony
Hilda, Hildur
Henrik
Fabian, Sebastian
Agnes, Agneta
Vincent, Viktor
Frej, Freja
Erika
Paul, Pål
Bodil, Boel
Göte, Göta
Karl (*), Karla
Diana
Gunilla, Gunhild
Ivar, Joar

February
Max, Maximilian
Kyndelsmässodagen (Candlemas, no name)
Disa, Hjördis
Ansgar, Anselm
Agata, Agda
Dorotea, Doris
Rikard, Dick
Berta, Bert
Fanny, Franciska
Iris
Yngve, Inge
Evelina, Evy
Agne, Ove
Valentin
Sigfrid
Julia, Julius
Alexandra, Sandra
Frida, Fritiof
Gabriella, Ella
Vivianne
Hilding
Pia
Torsten, Torun
Mattias, Mats
Sigvard, Sivert
Torgny, Torkel
Lage
Maria
Leap Day (no name)

March
Albin, Elvira
Ernst, Erna
Gunborg, Gunvor
Adrian, Adriana
Tora, Tove
Ebba, Ebbe
Camilla
Siv, Saga ( 2018 )
Torbjörn, Torleif
Edla, Ada
Edvin, Egon
Viktoria, Victoria (*)
Greger
Matilda, Maud
Kristoffer, Christel
Herbert, Gilbert
Gertrud
Edvard, Edmund
Josef, Josefina
Joakim, Kim
Bengt
Kennet, Kent
Gerda, Gerd
Gabriel, Rafael
Marie bebådelsedag (Annunciation to Mary, no name)
Emanuel
Rudolf, Ralf
Malkolm, Morgan
Jonas, Jens
Holger, Holmfrid
Ester

April
Harald, Hervor
Gudmund, Ingemund
Ferdinand, Nanna
Marianne, Marlene
Irene, Irja
Vilhelm, William ( 2011 )
Irma, Irmelin
Nadja, Tanja
Otto, Ottilia
Ingvar, Ingvor
Ulf, Ylva
Liv
Artur, Douglas
Tiburtius
Olivia, Oliver
Patrik, Patricia
Elias, Elis
Valdemar, Volmar
Olaus, Ola
Amalia, Amelie
Anneli, Annika
Allan, Glenn
Georg, Göran
Vega
Markus
Teresia, Terese
Engelbrekt
Ture, Tyra
Tyko
Mariana

May
Valborg
Filip, Phillip (*) Filippa
John, Jane
Monika, Mona
Gotthard Erhard
Marit, Rita
Carina, Carita
Åke
Reidar, Reidun
Esbjörn, Styrbjörn
Märta, Märit
Charlotta, Lotta
Linnea, Linn
Halvard, Halvar
Sofia, Sonja
Ronald, Ronny
Rebecka, Ruben
Erik
Maj, Majken
Karolina, Carola
Konstantin, Conny
Hemming, Henning
Desideria, Desirée
Ivan, Vanja
Urban
Vilhelmina, Vilma
Beda, Blenda
Ingeborg, Borghild
Yvonne, Jeanette
Vera, Veronika
Petronella, Pernilla

June
Gun, Gunnel
Rutger, Roger
Ingemar, Gudmar
Solbritt, Solveig
Bo
Gustav, Gösta
Robert, Robin
Eivor, Majvor
Börje, Birger
Svante, Boris
Bertil, Berthold
Eskil
Aina, Aino
Håkan, Hakon
Margit, Margot
Axel, Axelina
Torborg, Torvald
Björn, Bjarne
Germund, Görel
Linda
Alf, Alvar
Paulina, Paula
Adolf, Alice
Johannes Döparens dag (John the Baptist's Day, no name)
David, Salomon
Rakel, Lea
Selma, Fingal
Leo
Peter, Petra
Elof, Leif

July
Aron, Mirjam
Rosa, Rosita
Aurora
Ulrika, Ulla
Laila, Ritva
Esaias, Jessika
Klas
Kjell
Jörgen, Örjan
André, Andrea
Eleonora, Ellinor, Leonore (*)
Herman, Hermine
Joel, Judit
Folke
Ragnhild, Ragnvald
Reinhold, Reine
Bruno
Fredrik, Fritz
Sara
Margareta, Greta
Johanna
Magdalena, Madeleine (*)
Emma, Emmy ( 2015 )
Kristina, Kerstin
Jakob
Jesper, Jasmin ( 2015 )
Marta
Botvid, Seved
Olof, Olle
Algot
Helena, Elin

August
Per
Karin, Kajsa
Tage
Arne, Arnold
Ulrik, Alrik
Alfons, Inez
Dennis, Denise
Silvia (*), Sylvia
Roland
Lars
Saint Tiburtius and Saint Susanna
Klara
Kaj
Uno
Stella, Estelle {*}
Brynolf
Verner, Valter
Ellen, Lena
Magnus, Måns
Bernhard, Bernt
Jon, Jonna
Henrietta, Henrika
Signe, Signhild
Bartolomeus
Lovisa, Louise
Östen
Rolf, Raoul
Fatima, Leila ( 2011 )
Hans, Hampus
Albert, Albertina
Arvid, Vidar

September
Samuel, Sam ( 2011 )
Justus, Justina
Alfhild, Alva
Gisela
Adela, Heidi
Lilian (*), Lilly
Kevin, Roy ( 2011 )
Alma, Hulda
Anita, Annette
Tord, Turid
Dagny, Helny
Åsa, Åslög
Sture
Ida, Ronja ( 2018 )
Sigrid, Siri
Dag, Daga
Hildegard, Magnhild
Orvar
Fredrika
Elise, Lisa, James
Matteus
Maurits, Moritz
Tekla, Tea
Gerhard, Gert
Tryggve
Enar, Einar
Dagmar, Rigmor
Lennart, Leonard
Mikael, Mikaela
Helge

October
Ragnar, Ragna
Ludvig, Love
Evald, Osvald
Frans, Frank
Bror
Jenny, Jennifer
Birgitta (*), Britta
Nils
Ingrid, Inger
Harry, Harriet
Erling, Jarl
Valfrid, Manfred
Berit, Birgit
Stellan
Hedvig, Hillevi
Finn
Antonia, Toini
Lukas
Tore, Tor
Sibylla
Ursula, Yrsa
Marika, Marita
Severin, Sören
Evert, Eilert
Inga, Ingalill
Amanda, Rasmus
Sabina
Simon, Simone
Viola
Elsa, Isabella
Edit, Edgar

November
Allhelgonadagen (All Saints' Day, no name)
Tobias
Hubert, Hugo
Sverker
Eugen, Eugenia
Gustav Adolf
Ingegerd, Ingela
Vendela
Teodor, Teodora
Martin, Martina
Mårten
Konrad, Kurt
Kristian, Krister
Emil, Emilia
Leopold
Vibeke, Viveka
Naemi, Naima
Lillemor, Moa
Elisabet, Lisbet
Pontus, Marina
Helga, Olga
Cecilia, Sissela
Klemens
Gudrun, Rune
Katarina, Katja
Linus
Astrid, Asta
Malte
Sune
Andreas, Anders

December
Oskar, Ossian
Beata, Beatrice
Lydia, Cornelia
Barbara, Barbro
Sven
Nikolaus, Niklas, Nicolas
Angela, Angelika
Virginia
Anna
Malin, Malena
Daniel, Daniela
Alexander, Alexis
Lucia
Sten, Sixten
Gottfrid
Assar
Stig
Abraham
Isak
Israel, Moses
Tomas
Natanael, Jonatan
Adam
Eva
Juldagen (Christmas Day, no name)
Stefan, Staffan
Johannes, Johan
Benjamin (also Värnlösa barns dag)
Natalia, Natalie
Abel, Set
Sylvester

References

Swedish culture
Sweden
Saints days
Swedish given names